The 2016 Australian Formula Ford Series is an Australian motor racing series open to Formula Ford and Formula Ford 1600.

The first four rounds were sanctioned by the Confederation of Australian Motor Sport (CAMS), whereas the latter two rounds were sanctioned by the Australian Auto Sport Alliance (AASA).

Team and drivers

Race calendar
The series is being contested over six rounds with three races at each round. All races were held in Australia.

Series standings 

Australian Formula Ford 1600 Series

NOTE:  Because of age restrictions, Will Brown, who finished second, claimed the Andersen Promotions Road to Indy Shootout prize.

References

Formula Ford
Australian Formula Ford Series